Home Sweet Home is a 1980 Australian comedy television series produced by the Australian Broadcasting Corporation, starring John Bluthal.

The series was created by Vince Powell, and the pilot was produced by Michael Mills. William Motzing wrote the music.

Writers for the series included: Powell, Charles Stamp, Ralph Peterson, Ian Heydon, David Dorimo and Hugh Stuckey

Cast
 John Bluthal as Enzo Pacelli
 Arianthe Galani as Maria Pacelli (Enzo's wife)
 Christopher Bell as Bobby Pacelli (their older son, a young adult)
 Carmen Tanti as Anna Pacelli (their daughter, an older teenager / young adult)
 Miles Buchanan as Tony Pacelli (their younger son, high school aged)
 Edmund Pegge as Father Murphy
 Maria Rosa Cerizza as "Sofia" (Mama)
 Donald MacDonald as Father Kelly
 Andrew Bond as Marcello Pacelli

Plot
Enzo and Maria Pacelli migrated from Italy to Australia with their three children.

Enzo is a taxi driver who wants to continue to do things the Italian way, but his Australian educated children are more interested in Australian culture.

References
 "The Australian Film and Television Companion" — compiled by Tony Harrison — Simon & Schuster Australia, 1994

External links
 
 John Bluthal at home, Australian Women's Weekly, 1 Oct 1980

1980 Australian television series debuts
1982 Australian television series endings
Australian Broadcasting Corporation original programming
Australian comedy television series